Chedi was a kingdom which fell roughly in the Bundelkhand division of Madhya Pradesh regions to the south of river Yamuna along the river Ken. Its capital city was called Suktimati in Sanskrit.

According to the Mahabharata, the Chedi Kingdom was ruled by Shishupala, an ally of Jarasandha of Magadha and Duryodhana of Kuru. He was a rival of Vasudeva Krishna who was his uncle's son. He was killed by Vasudeva Krishna during the Rajasuya sacrifice of the Pandava king Yudhishthira. Nakula's wife was from Chedi. Prominent Chedis during the Kurukshetra War included Damaghosha, Shishupala, Dhrishtaketu, Suketu, Sarabha , Nakula's wife Karenumati, Dhrishtaketu's sons. Other Chedis included King Uparichara Vasu, his children, King Suvahu, King Sahaja. It was ruled during early periods by Paurava kings and later by Yadava  kings in the central part of the country.

In the Puranas 

The Chedi clan and kingdom was founded by Chidi, the son of Vidarbha and belonging to the Yadava dynasty. Chedi was later conquered and ruled by the Pururava King Vasu Uparichara, upon the order of Indra. Uparichara's descendant is Shishupala.

Chedi mentioned as a Kingdom of Ancient India (Bharata Varsha) 

The Kuru-Panchalas, the Salwas, the Madreyas, the Jangalas, the Surasenas, the Kalingas, the Vodhas, the Mallas, the Matsyas, the Sauvalyas, the Kuntalas, the Kasi-Kosalas, the Chedis, the Karushas, the Bhojas...(6,9)

Chedi was one among the kingdoms chosen for spending the 13th year of exile by the Pandavas.

Surrounding the kingdom of the Kurus, are, many countries beautiful and abounding in corn, such as Panchala, Chedi, Matsya, Surasena, Pattachchara, Dasarna, Navarashtra, Malla, Salva, Yugandhara, Saurashtra, Avanti, and the spacious Kuntirashtra. (4,1)

King Uparichara Vasu and the festival of bamboo pole 

Uparichara Vasu was a king of Chedi belonging to the Puru Dynasty. He was known as the friend of Indra. During his reign, Chedi kingdom had a good economic system and contained much mineral wealth, which made a lot of merchants around the world, come to the Kingdom. It was abundant in animals and corn. There were many towns and cities in the kingdom. He possessed a very special chariot. He introduced a festival in his kingdom in the honour of Indra. The festival involved planting of a bamboo pole every year, in honour of Indra. The king will then pray for the expansion of his cities and kingdom. After erecting the pole, people decked it with golden cloth and scents and garlands and various ornaments. From Chedi, he ruled a large territory, placing his sons as governors of various provinces. His son Vrihadratha (Maharatha) was installed in Magadha, who later fathered Emperor Jarasandha. His other sons, viz., Pratyagraha, Kusamva (Manivahana), Mavella and Yadu also became governors at various places. Thus the Chedi king attained the status of an emperor and his kingdom became a vast empire. He diverted the waters of river Suktimati from the locks of the Mountain Kolahala, for irrigating his capital-city which he named Suktimati. (1,63)

This beautiful city of the Chedis was called after the Oyster. (14,83)

His wife Girika, was from the valley of Kolahala. Girika's brother was installed as the generalissimo of Vasu's army. Apart from his five royal sons, he had a son and a daughter born of a woman of fisherman community. The male child, in due course established the Matsya Kingdom and founded the royal dynasty called Matsya Dynasty. The female child lived as a member of fishermen community. Her line established as fishermen on the banks of river Yamuna, in the kingdom of Kurus. The famous Kuru king Santanu's wife Satyavati was from this fishermen community. The author of Mahābhārata, vis Krishna Dwaipayana Vyasa and the Kuru kings viz Chitrangada and Vichitravirya were the sons of Satyavati. Pandavas and Kauravas were the grandsons of Vichitravirya.(1,63)

Another story connects Vasu with vegetarianism in ancient India. Filled with doubts respecting the propriety of eating flesh, some sages asked Uparichara Vasu for solving them. King Vasu, knowing that flesh is inedible, answered that it was edible. From that moment Vasu fell down from the firmament on the earth. After this he once more repeated his opinion, with the result that he had to sink below the earth for it. (13,115)
A similar story connects Vasu with the issue of animal sacrifices. In his opinion sacrifices could be performed with or without the slaughter of animals. (14,91)

King Shishupala of Chedi 

Shishupala was the malevolent son of the King Damaghosha (1,189). He had another name viz Sunitha. His mother was Shrutakirti, who was the sister of Kunti, the mother of Pandavas. Both Kunti and Shrutakirti were sisters of Vasudeva the father of Vasudeva Krishna. However Shishupala developed enmity with Krishna (2,44), though he was affectionate to the Pandava Bhima. During his military campaign to collect tribute for Pandava king Yudhishthira's Rajasuya sacrifice, Bhima stayed at the palace of Shishupala for a month as a guest.  He also accepted Yudhishthira's sway over his kingdom and gave Bhima tribute (2,28). During the midst of Yudhishthira's Rajasuya ceremony, a dispute arose between Shishupala and Vasudeva Krishna. Pandavas tried to mediate. He also rebuked the Pandavas and Kuru grandsire Bhishma along with Krishna. Then Krishna, extremely provoked, decapitated Shishupala. (2,44).

Shishupala's hostilities to Krishna were many. He burned the city of Dwaraka, while Krishna was in Pragjyotisha with his army. He attacked king Bhoja, sporting at Raivataka hill close to Dwaraka. He stole the horse of Krishna's father Prince Vasudeva of Mathura, during his horse-sacrifice. He insulted the wife of Akrura (Vabhru – the friend of Krishna), on her way from Dwaraka to Sauvira Kingdom. He kidnapped the princess of Visala, viz Bhadra, the fiancé of Karusha king. (2,44)

Yudhishthira installed Shishupala's son in the throne of Chedi. (2,44)
Shishupala's sister was married to Bhima as per the reference in (15,25)

King Dhrishtaketu of Chedi 

Dhrishtaketu, the king of Chedi (3,12), was described as the elder son of King Shishupala (5,50). During the time of Dhrishtaketu too, Suktimati was the capital of Chedi. Dhrishtaketu was an army-general in the army of Pandavas in the Kurukshetra War. He was the leader of the army of the Chedis, the Kasis, and the Karushas (5,199). He was a Maharatha (a great chariot-warrior) as per the rating of Bhishma (5,172). One of his sons also took part in the war (5,57). He was slain by Drona (7,128), (11,25). Dhrishtaketu was also slain in battle by Drona.

Chedi Princess, Karenumati, was wedded to the Pandava Nakula, and prince Narimitra was their son. (1,95). It is not clear if she was Dhrishtaketu's sister. However, it was mentioned that his sister was the wife of one of the Pandavas (3,22) (15,1).
Sarabha, the middle son of Shishupala became the king of Chedi after the death of Dhrishtaketu. He was killed in battle by Arjuna during his military campaign, after the Kurukshetra War. (14,83)
 Mahipala, the youngest son of Shishupala, was killed by Dussasana with an exploding arrow on the 9th day of the Kurukshetra War.

Other Kings of Chedi 

King Subahu was described as the king of Chedi, during the time of Nishadha king Nala and Lord Rama . His wife, Damayanti the princess of Vidarbha, left alone in forest, met a caravan of traders heading towards Chedi. Along with them she reached the Chedi capital and lived as a servant maid of queen, in the palace of Chedi. (3–64,65)
King Sahaja among the Chedis and Matsyas, were described as an annihilator of his own race (5,74). He was the ally of Lord Rama.

Chedis in Kurukshetra War 
King of Chedi Kingdom, Dhrishtaketu, the son of Shishupala (who was killed by Krishna on the day of Yudhishthira's Rajasuya Yagna) and his sons (at least 3) took part in the Kurukshetra War from the Pandavas' side. Dhrishtaketu was killed by Guru Dronacharya on the 14th day of the war. Prince of Chedi kingdom (Son of Dhrishaketu) was killed by Ashwatthama on the 15th day of the war.

Chedi King Dhrishtaketu and his sons

The powerful chief of the Chedis, Dhrishtaketu, accompanied by an Akshauhini, came to the sons of Pandu. (5–19,57)
The assembled kings of the Chedi and the Karusha tribes have all taken the part of the Pandavas with all their resources. (5,22)
Chedi King Dhrishtaketu employed Kamboja steeds of variegated hue in the battle (7,23)
Drona slew Dhrishtaketu and his son (7,122)
Another Chedi prince was slain by Ashwatthama, the son of Drona (7,198)
Another son of Shishupala, brother of Dhrishtaketu, named Suketu also was slain by Drona (8,6)

In popular culture 

In the 2012 anthropological thriller The Krishna Key, the origin of Chedi clan has been linked to the Yadavas. Dr. Devendra Chedi is one of the main characters of the novel who is the genetic expert.

See also 
Mahameghavahana dynasty
Epic India
Shishupala
Ishwarsena
Abhira

References

Kisari Mohan Ganguli, The Mahabharata of Krishna-Dwaipayana Vyasa Translated into English Prose, 1883–1896.

Indo-Aryan peoples
Yadava kingdoms